Ernest Beckett (1869 – 1952) was a footballer who played as a forward for Burslem Port Vale in the 1890s.

Career
Beckett joined Burslem Port Vale in July 1895 from Newcastle Swifts. Scoring on his debut at Rotherham Town in a 2–0 win on 7 September 1895, he went on to score past Liverpool in a 5–4 victory at the Athletic Ground on 21 October. He became the club's top-scorer for the 1895–96 season with eight goals in 27 appearances. He returned to the Swifts in September 1896, after Vale were not re-elected into the Football League. After the club spent two seasons in the Midland League, Beats returned to Port Vale in August 1898. He scored nine goals in 21 Second Division games in 1898–99, before departing again in the summer.

Career statistics
Source:

References

1869 births
1952 deaths
Sportspeople from Newcastle-under-Lyme
English footballers
Association football forwards
Port Vale F.C. players
English Football League players